Najib bin Lep is a Malaysian politician who served as Member of the Johor State Legislative Assembly (MLA) for Bukit Pasir from May 2018 to March 2022. In the 2022 election, he contested the Bukit Pasir seat as an independent candidate and due to his actions he was sacked as a PAS member with immediate effect.

On 18 October 2022, Najib Lep join UMNO.

Election results

References

Living people
1963 births
Malaysian people of Malay descent
Malaysian Muslims
People from Johor
Former Malaysian Islamic Party politicians
United Malays National Organisation politicians
21st-century Malaysian politicians
Members of the Johor State Legislative Assembly